The Greencastle-Antrim School District is a medium, rural, public school district located in Franklin County, Pennsylvania. It encompasses the borough of Greencastle and the surrounding Antrim Township. According to 2000 federal census data, it served a resident population of 16,226 people. By 2010, the District's population increased to 18,916 people. According to the US Census Bureau, in 2009, the District residents' per capita income was $19,566, while the median family income was $49,318. In the Commonwealth, the median family income was $49,501 and the United States median family income was $49,445, in 2010.

Greencastle-Antrim School District operates five schools: Greencastle-Antrim Primary School (K-2), Greencastle-Antrim Elementary School (3-5), Greencastle-Antrim Middle School (6-8), and Greencastle-Antrim High School (9-12). Alternatively, students may choose to attend Franklin Virtual Academy which is an online education program operated by a cooperative agreement of Franklin County public school districts. Greencastle-Antrim High School students may also choose to attend Franklin County Career and Technology Center for training in the construction and mechanical trades. The Lincoln Intermediate Unit IU12 provides the District with a wide variety of services like specialized education for disabled students and hearing, speech and visual disability services and professional development for staff and faculty. Greencastle-Antrim School District is affiliated with six neighboring districts in a Learning Center for severely handicapped children.

In 1966, the District purchased the Stover–Winger Farm.

Extracurriculars
The Greencastle-Antim School District offers a wide variety of activities, clubs and an extensive sports program. Sports are provided under the  Pennsylvania Interscholastic Athletic Association and the Mid Penn Conference.

Sports
The District funds:

Boys
Baseball - AAAAA
Basketball- AAAAA
Cross Country - AA
Football - AAAAA
Golf - AAA
Soccer - AAA
Track and Field - AAA
 Wrestling	 - AAA

Girls
Basketball - AAAAA
Cross Country - AAA
Field Hockey - AA
Golf
Soccer (Fall) - AAA
Softball - AAAAA
Track and Field - AAA
Volleyball - AAA

Junior high school sports

Boys
Basketball
Cross Country
Football
Track and Field
Wrestling	

Girls
Basketball
Cross Country
Field Hockey
Track and Field
Volleyball 

According to PIAA directory July 2012

References

School districts in Franklin County, Pennsylvania